Marcel Hellman (31 May 1898 – 28 April 1986) was a Romanian-born British film producer, who worked closely with Douglas Fairbanks Jr. and Harold French.

In 1936 he founded Criterion Film Productions together with Douglas Fairbanks Jr., which produced four films with Fairbanks in the lead, and in 1942 he started a production company known as Excelsior Films Ltd, which in the late 1950s changed name to Marcel Hellman Productions.

Selected filmography

 The Secret Courier (1928)
 The Last Fort (1928)
 Father and Son (1929)
 The Green Monocle (1929)
 Everybody Wins (1930)
 The Son of the White Mountain (1930)
 Headfirst into Happiness (1931)
  (1932)
 Dreaming Lips (1932)
 The Marathon Runner (1933)
 The Amateur Gentleman (1936)
 Accused (1936)
 Crime Over London (1936)
 Jump for Glory (1937)
 Jeannie (1941)
 Secret Mission (1942)
 Talk About Jacqueline (1942)
 They Met in the Dark (1943)
 A Voice in the Night (1946 film) (1946)
 Meet Me at Dawn (1947)
 This Was a Woman (1948)
 Happy Go Lovely (1951)
 Duel in the Jungle (1954)
 Let's Be Happy (1957)
 North West Frontier (1959)
 The Amorous Adventures of Moll Flanders (1965)

References

External links
 
 
Marcel Hellman Papers at University of Texas

1898 births
1985 deaths
British film producers
Romanian film producers
Film people from Bucharest
Jewish emigrants from Nazi Germany to the United Kingdom